Anantapur mandal is one of the 54 mandals in Anantapur district of the Indian state of Andhra Pradesh. It is administered under Anantapur revenue division and its headquarters are located at Anantapur. The mandal is bounded by Kudair, Garladinne, Singanamala, Atmakur, Raptadu, Bukkarayasamudram and Bathalapalle mandals.

Towns and villages 

 census, the mandal has 21 settlements. It includes, 16 villages and 4 census towns and 1 municipal corporation:

See also 
List of mandals in Andhra Pradesh

References

Mandals in Anantapur district